The List of New Deal murals is a list of murals created in the United States as part of a federally sponsored New Deal project.  This list excludes murals placed in post offices, which are listed in List of United States post office murals. Source is Park and Markowitz’s Democratic Vistas unless otherwise specified.

Alabama

Alaska

Arizona

Arkansas

California

Colorado

Connecticut

Delaware

District of Columbia

New Deal art was installed in the Social Security building (now HHS), the Department of the Interior, the Department of Justice building, the Department of Labor building (now Customs and Immigration), the Apex building (now Federal Trade Commission), the Government Printing Office Annex, the Home Owners Loan Corporation, the National Zoological Park, the District of Columbia Recorder of Deeds building, the Procurement Division Building (now National Capitol Region Office Building, General Services Administration), and the War Department (now Department of State).

Elsewhere than government building

Social Security Building

Main Interior Building

Department of Justice

Department of Labor Building

National Zoo

Washington, D.C. Recorder of Deeds

Procurement Division Building

Florida

Georgia

Hawaii

Idaho

Illinois

Indiana

Iowa

Kansas

Kentucky

Louisiana

Maine

Maryland

Massachusetts

Michigan

Minnesota

Mississippi

Missouri

Montana

Nebraska

Nevada

New Hampshire

New Jersey

New Mexico

New York

North Carolina

North Dakota

Ohio

Oklahoma

Oregon

Pennsylvania

Puerto Rico

Rhode Island

South Carolina

South Dakota

Tennessee

Texas

Utah

Vermont

Virgin Islands

Virginia

Washington

Wisconsin

Wyoming

See also
 List of New Deal sculpture
 List of United States post office murals

References

Murals in the United States
Public Works of Art Project
Section of Painting and Sculpture
Treasury Relief Art Project